The Pennsylvania State Game Lands Number 137 are Pennsylvania State Game Lands in Armstrong County in Pennsylvania in the United States providing hunting, bird watching, and other activities.

Geography
SGL 137 consists of a single parcel located in Mahoning Township. It lies in the watershed of Redbank Creek and Mahoning Creek, both draining to the Allegheny River, part of the Ohio River watershed. Nearby communities include the boroughs of New Bethlehem and South Bethlehem and the populated places Climax, Cottage Hill, Distant, Fairmount City, and Saint Charles. The highway carrying Pennsylvania Route 28 and Pennsylvania Route 66 passes through the Game Lands, Pennsylvania Route 861 runs north of the Game Lands.

Statistics

Biology
Hunting and furtaking species include bear (Ursus americanus), Bobcat (Lynx rufus), Coyote (Canis latrans), deer (Odocoileus virginianus), Gray fox (Urocyon cinereoargenteus), Red fox (Vulpes vulpes), grouse (Bonasa umbellus), mink (Neovison vison), Raccoon (Procyoon lotor), squirrel (Sciurus carolinensis), and turkey (Meleagris gallopavo). The habitat management goal of SGL 137 is to favor requirements for deer and grouse, which coincides with the non-game focus for aspen stands, interior forest conditions as well as forested riparian areas.

See also
 Pennsylvania State Game Lands
 Pennsylvania State Game Lands Number 105, also located in Armstrong County
 Pennsylvania State Game Lands Number 247, also located in Armstrong County
 Pennsylvania State Game Lands Number 259, also located in Armstrong County
 Pennsylvania State Game Lands Number 287, also located in Armstrong County

References

137
Protected areas of Armstrong County, Pennsylvania